Panemunė Castle is a castle on the right bank of the Nemunas river, in Vytėnai, Jurbarkas district, Lithuania.
The initial hill fort of the Teutonic Knights (erected 1343) was replaced by a castle built in 1604-1610 by a noble Hungarian descent János Eperjes. The name "Panemunė" ("along the Nemunas", pronounced Pa-ne-mu-ne), it is guessed, arose from the former Panemunė Manor that was once here. Panemunė Castle was not designed to be a stronghold for the defence of the land but a typical, for the beginning of the 17th century, nobleman castle with defensive fittings, residential buildings, and farm buildings. Panemunė Castle became one of the most beautiful Renaissance era building in Lithuania. The castle was reconstructed around 1759 by Gelgaudai family. The new owners established lawish manor house like interiors with frescos, which has been recently discovered, while remaining wings of the castle is still under restoration. 
At present the castle is prepared for visitors. The castle stands in a park on a high hill and is surrounded by five cascading ponds. During a tourism season, works of Vilnius Art Academy are exhibited in the castle. It is possible to walk inside the castle, and admire the wonderful view that open from the castle tower.

Gallery

See also
List of castles in Lithuania

References

External links

 Panemunės pilis 
 Interior 
 The Association of Castles and Museums around the Baltic Sea

Castles in Lithuania
Renaissance architecture in Lithuania
Houses completed in 1610
Castles of the Teutonic Knights
Buildings and structures in Tauragė County
Tourist attractions in Tauragė County
1343 establishments in Europe